J-blogosphere is the name that some members of the Jewish blogging community use to refer to themselves. Blogs with a Jewish focus are called J-blogs. The name "J-blogosphere" was coined by Steven I. Weiss  when he was the leader of "Protocols," a now defunct group J-blog, and one of the first notable Jewish blogs. Variations on the term were employed there as early as August 2003, and the first use of "J-blogosphere" appears to have been made in February 2004.

Overview
A blog is generally accepted as a "J-blog", or part of the "J-blogosphere", if the blogger is Jewish and discusses Jewish political, religious, or personal themes.  There is no way of knowing exactly how many J-blogs there are, although several have come together to create a Jewish pod on BlogAds.

The JIBs
The "Jewish and Israel Blog Awards" are the J-blogosphere's informal annual award contest. The aim of the contest is to direct new readers towards Jewish, Israeli, and pro-Israel blogs. The JIBs begin with nominations in January and then a semifinal and final round. Good-natured rivalry and campaigning are associated with this event.

The contest was first run in 2004.  In 2005 the Jerusalem Post took over hosting duties. 

In 2006, Israel Forum was invited to host the JIB awards and instead established a new blogging award named The People's Choice Awards. This resulted in the cancellation of the JIBs and The People's Choice Awards running in its place.

In 2007, a group of Jewish bloggers formed a committee to run the awards and launched JibAwards.com as the awards site.

There have been no Jewish Blog Awards since 2008.

Haveil Havalim
"Haveil Havalim" is a weekly collection of Jewish & Israeli blog highlights, tidbits and points of interest collected from blogs all around the world. The name, taken from Ecclesiastes 1:2, is generally translated "vanity of vanities". There have been more than 330 editions of Haveil Havelim, and more than 30 different bloggers have hosted.

See also
 CampusJ
 Cyberchurch
 Bloggernacle

Notes

References

J Weekly Magazine of Northern California, "Local Jewish blog attempts to unite community", Amanda Ogus (Summer 2006)
Contact Magazine, "The Internet: Pathways and Possibilities", Various Authors (Spring 2006) – Adobe PDF Format
PresenTense Magazine article, "Two Jews, Three Blogs: Inside Jokes, Inner Dissent and Inner Life from Bloggers of the Tribe", Esther D. Kustanowitz (Spring 2006)
JTA article, "From Internet pals to real friends, blogs remaking Jewish community", Sue Fishkoff (May 8, 2006)
 B'nai B'rith Magazine article, "Cruising The Cybershtetl", Richard Greenberg and Menachem Wecker (Spring 2006)
JTA article, "Sermonizing Mingles With Sex Talk As Jewish Surfers Pick Up Blogging", Rachel Silverman (January 18, 2006)
Chicago Jewish News article, “Can We Blog? New Way to Talk About Jewish Issues”, Rachel Silverman
Jewsweek article, "The Jewish Corner of the Blogosphere", Alli Magidsohn
Cleveland Jewish News article, "Don't Call Me Rebbetzin", Lila Hanft (October 20, 2005)
World Jewish Digest article, "People of the Blog", Sarah Bronson (July, 2005)
Bitch Magazine article, "Blog is My Co-pilot", Rachel Barenblat (Fall, 2004)

External links
J-Blogosphere

 
Blogospheres